Moasseseh-ye Hajji Khan Dowlati (also Romanized as Moasseseh-ye Ḩājjī Khān Dowlatī; also known as Mo’asseseh-ye Ḩājjī Khān Dūstī) is a village in Mollasani Rural District, in the Central District of Bavi County, Khuzestan Province, Iran. At the 2006 census, its population was 33, in 9 families.

References 

Populated places in Bavi County